Pamela Margaret Huby (21 April 1922 - 18 February 2019) was a British philosopher and emeritus reader in philosophy at the University of Liverpool.

Born in Dulwich, she was educated at James Allen's Girls' School and then won a senior scholarship in Classics to Lady Margaret Hall Oxford University.  She was then an assistant lecturer in Classics at Reading and after a year returned to Oxford to lecture at St Anne's College where she switched to the field of ancient Greek philosophy, moving to Liverpool two years later.

Books
 Greek Ethics (1967) 
 Plato and Modern Morality (1972)
 Theophrastus of Eresus (1999)

References

20th-century British philosophers
British scholars of ancient Greek philosophy
Philosophy academics
People educated at James Allen's Girls' School
1922 births
2019 deaths
Alumni of Lady Margaret Hall, Oxford